Jennifer Ulrich (born 18 October 1984) is a German actress who has starred in such films as The Wave and We Are The Night. She was born in Lichtenberg, Berlin.

Career
Jennifer Ulrich started her actress career with Big Girls Don't Cry, released in 2002, in which she played the role of Yvonne. After participating in films such as The Elementary Particles in 2006, and Seven Days Sunday in 2007,. She played the female lead role in 2008's film The Wave and in the vampire film We Are the Night. Both were directed by Dennis Gansel. She is a fan of genre films, like horror.

Filmography

References

External links
 

1984 births
Living people
People from East Berlin
German film actresses
Actresses from Berlin
21st-century German actresses
20th-century German women